This is a list of films that showcase stop motion animation, and is divided into four sections: animated features, TV series, live-action features, and animated shorts. This list includes films that are not exclusively stop motion.

Stop motion animated features

Released

Upcoming

Stop motion TV series

Live-action features with stop motion sequences
These films are primarily not stop motion, but incorporate elements of it, often for special effects.

Notable stop motion shorts

See also
 Stop motion
 Clay animation
 List of films featuring clay animation
 Puppetoon
 History of animation
 Highest-grossing stop motion animation films

References

01
Stop motion
Stop motion
films